Indifference may refer to:

 Apathy, a psychological attitude
 A concept of beneficial detachment in Ignatian spirituality
 Indifference (album), 1985 album by the Proletariat, or the title song
 "Indifference" (Law & Order), 1990 episode of the television series Law & Order
 "Indifference" (The Walking Dead), 2013 episode of the television series The Walking Dead
 Indifference curve, in microeconomic theory, a graph describing consumer preferences
 Principle of indifference, in probability theory, a rule for assigning epistemic probabilities
 A song on the band Pearl Jam's second album Vs.
In Catholicism, indifferentism, the belief which holds that no religion is superior to another

See also
 
 
 Difference (disambiguation)